Eden College Durban is an independent school for boys and girls located in Glenmore, Durban, KwaZulu-Natal, in the Republic of South Africa. It comprises a pre-primary school (grades 000 to 0), a preparatory school (grades 1 to 6), a middle school (grades 7 to 9) and a college (grades 10 to 12). Eden College Durban was previously called Crawford College, Durban until 2007 and Carmel College Durban before that. Eden College has just under 500 pupils.

History
Eden Schools were established in Gauteng over 30 years ago.

The Chief Executive of Eden, Mr Allan Zulberg, co-founded Eden in 1974. He played a leading role in the establishment of Midrand University and Educor. He was an executive director of Educor. He also served as Chief Executive of King David Schools for a time. Mr Zulberg taught Mathematics and Physical Science for many years, and also served as headmaster of Eden Lyndhurst.

Eden Schools operate in Lyndhurst, Randburg and Durban. Its head office is in Lyndhurst, Johannesburg. Mr Joe Khouri is Chief Operating Officer, an educator, past principal and lecturer at Wits University. Mr Allan Fehler is the group's Financial Director.

In 2007 Eden opened in Durban. The school was previously managed by Crawfordschools. The school operates a Pre-Primary, Preparatory, Middle School and College High School in Glenmore.

Matric academic results 

Since Eden College Durban's opening in 2007, the Matrics have maintained a 100% pass rate, a 100% university exemption rate, as well as an average of over 3 As per learner. The Class of 2010 produced over 4 As per learner and achieved an average aggregate of 91,9%.

Matric subjects offered 

 English
 Afrikaans
 IsiZulu language
 French
 Hebrew
 Life Orientation
 Mathematics
 Mathematics Literacy
 Mathematics Paper 3
 Life Sciences (Biology)
 Physical Sciences (Chemistry and Physics)
 History
 Geography
 Accounting
 Business Studies
 Information Technology (Computer Science)
 Drama Studies
 Music Studies
 Visual Arts (Art)
 Dance studies

Headmasters

Principals 

 Karen Morrison 2018 - 
 Christopher Marcellin (20082017)
 Barry Swain (200708)

Deputy Principals 

 Charli Wiggill 2007 - 2016
 Callum Robertson 2017 - 2017 
 Karen Morrison 2017 - 2017
 Christa Booysens 2018 -

Phase Heads 

 College (FET): Karen Morrison
 Middle School: Christa Booysens
 Preparatory: Greta Peens
 Pre-Primary: Chantal Cox

Stewards 

The leaders of the school are known as Stewards. This is the similar to other schools' system of Prefects.

Multiform 

The learners of Eden College Durban have a range of clothing to choose from, hence the term "multiform" is used. The multiform includes: stone (ecru) shorts and trousers, a blue collared shirt, a white collared shirt, as well as a white collared sleeveless shirt and tartan skirt for Girls. The learners also wear a formal uniform for formal occasions (such as assemblies), this comprises a navy blue blazer (or a white Honours Blazer), a white long-sleeved formal shirt (or short-sleeved for girls), tartan tie, and long stone (ecru) trousers for boys and a tartan skirt for girls.

Today 

The school is divided into four phases: Pre-Primary, Preparatory, Middle School and College.

Eden College Durban was established in 2007 and writes the NSC examinations.

Buildings 

The College and Middle School are located on the eastern side of the school and the Pre-Primary and Preparatory are located on the western side of the school.

External links 

 

Private schools in KwaZulu-Natal
2007 establishments in South Africa